Gremyachy is a rural locality (a settlement) in Tolshmenskoye Rural Settlement, Totemsky District, Vologda Oblast, Russia. The population was 481 as of 2002. There are 13 streets.

Geography 
Sosnovaya is the nearest rural locality.

References 

Rural localities in Totemsky District